Timothy M. Armstrong (born December 21, 1970) is an American business executive. He was formerly the CEO of Oath Inc., then a subsidiary of Verizon Communications that served as the umbrella company of its digital content subdivisions, including AOL and Yahoo!. Previously, he was the CEO of AOL Inc. from 2009 until its purchase by Verizon in 2015.

A Connecticut College graduate in economics and sociology, Armstrong began his career in journalism. He became known for his online advertising sales in the 1990s, and was appointed marketing director for Seattle-based online entertainment-and-news portal Starwave, which was acquired by Disney in 1998. He was vice-president of sales at the New York-based news-and-gaming company Snowball in 2000. He became U.S. sales chief for Google, and then became President of Google Americas operations. He replaced the outgoing Randy Falco as CEO of AOL in 2009.

Education and early career
Between 1989 and 1993, Armstrong studied for a double major in Economics and Sociology at Connecticut College. He played lacrosse, was on the rowing team, and coached the women's ice hockey team for four years. He also studied at the Lawrence Academy, and became a trustee of both the academy and Connecticut College.

After graduating from Connecticut College in 1993, Armstrong was responsible for teaching high school students in summer classes at Wellesley College, for a program called Exploration. A colleague convinced him to pursue a media career, which resulted in him establishing a financial newspaper for young people in Boston. Titled BIB (Beginnings in Boston), this paper offered advice to young college graduates on entering the workforce. To finance the newspaper, Armstrong and friend Michael Dressler sold their mountain bikes and amounted to a debt of about $100,000. In the fall of 1994, Armstrong and Dressler closed down BIB to run a larger, rival newspaper, Square Deal at Harvard Square, following the death of its chief editor.

Armstrong saw considerable potential for publishing online and earning revenue through advertising. He sold Square Deal and commenced working as an ad-sales director for I-Way, run by the Boston-based International Data Group. Armstrong was later appointed to Starwave, a Seattle-based online entertainment-and-news portal, in 1995. Disney acquired the firm in 1998. Armstrong served as the Director of Integrated Sales and Marketing for Starwave's and Disney's ABC and ESPN Internet ventures. While at Starwave, he made his first $1 million online advertising deal with Columbia/HCA, a health firm.

Google
In the summer of 2000, Armstrong was appointed vice-president of Strategic Partners at New York-based news-and-gaming company Snowball. While there he became interested in Google ads and arranged to meet its sales and operations chief, Omid Kordestani. Kordestani invited him to California to meet Sergey Brin and Larry Page, who subsequently appointed him as U.S. sales chief for Google. He held positions such as President of Google's Americas Operations, and Senior Vice President of Google Inc. Armstrong has been credited for helping establish Google AdSense in 2005. Armstrong led Google into display advertising, aided by a $3.1 billion acquisition of Doubleclick in 2007. He used part of the wealth he amassed at Google to establish the New Jersey news website Patch Media, which was later acquired by AOL when Armstrong was appointed.

AOL

In early 2009, Jeff Bewkes, the chairman of Time Warner, announced that he wanted to coordinate AOL as a private company. At the time, the firm's revenues had dropped around 22% to just under $3.3 billion between 2008 and 2009. Bewkes appointed Armstrong as CEO of AOL on March 12, 2009, seeing him as a way to regain and secure the trust of Wall Street, Silicon Valley, and advertisers.

Under Armstrong, AOL became a player in advertising. In 2009, Armstrong was named by Fortune magazine as one of the "40 under 40". Armstrong helped AOL rebrand as a content company, focusing on original material, and making the decision to cut the number of ads generated by the firm to make advertising more exclusive and appealing to the most prominent advertisers. In 2010, Time Warner formally consented to AOL becoming a privately traded company on the New York Stock Exchange. It resulted in a cut of the company's workforce by one-third and a reduction to often a single featured advert a day, instead of the 15 previously. That year, Armstrong sold AOL-owned social networking site Bebo for around $10 million, a reported eightieth of its original cost. Another 1000 employees were laid off in March 2011.

According to the Cambridge University Press, Armstrong's strategy focuses on digital journalism in local communities, especially ones without their own newspapers. Consolidating the move into journalism came in June 2011 with the acquisition of The Huffington Post. Armstrong appointed Arianna Huffington, the co-founder and editor-in-chief of the paper as president. Armstrong launched a number of sites under the AOL banner which specifically cater to women, including StyleList.com, AOL Shopping, and KitchenDaily.com, and 60% of the readers at Patch Media are female.

In the early 2010s, Armstrong has pursued a number of platform acquisitions for AOL, including the purchases of technology news portal TechCrunch in September 2010, Adap.tv in 2013 for $405 million, and Gravity in January 2014. Armstrong appointed Saul Hansell, a technology and finance reporter of "The New York Times" to run a journalism and engineering system for AOL called Seed, based on the concept that editors can make decisions on what to write about by compiling data and algorithms from the leading search engines like Google and social network sites like Facebook. By January 2011, Seed had a staff of 25 and had taken an active role in writing both news stories and compiling videos for AOL sites. The Patch remains a productive news source, and as of January 2011, it reportedly cost AOL approximately 30 million dollars a quarter to run. In a 2011 interview, Armstrong claimed that Patch was responsible for the "largest investment in local communities outside of what the Obama administration is doing." In 2010, Armstrong launched AOL's "Monster Help Day," which commits AOL employees worldwide to work for free for a day to raise money for charity. By the 6th Annual Help Day in 2015, the scheme had 85 projects running worldwide, with over 50,000 work hours donated.

In May 2015, Verizon Communications acquired AOL for $4.4 billion, moving AOL's stock up by over 17%. Armstrong remained in his position as CEO. Fortune conjectured that the Verizon deal would bring Armstrong himself approximately $59 million in stock options. Video content is increasingly becoming a major part of AOL in what CNBC describes as the "content golden age." The following month, he announced that AOL had entered into a ten-year agreement with Microsoft, giving AOL the responsibility for its advertising sales across Microsoft platforms, and AOL in return, agreed to use the Bing search engine instead of Google on its sites. In July, Armstrong was awarded the Life Achievement Award at the Corporate Social Responsibility Awards organized by Capalino+Company, a New York City-based government and community relations company. In September, Armstrong and AOL acquired mobile ad tech company Millennial Media in a deal worth a reported $238 million, to add a "leading supply-side platform for app monetization" to AOL's assets. Speaking at the MPA's American Magazine Media Conference in New York in January 2016, Armstrong stated: "I thought the Internet was the biggest thing to ever happen in my lifetime. I think mobile will dwarf that".

In January 2016, AOL bought off French programmatic ad platform AlephD, complementing the programmatic ad platform Armstrong had established for AOL in 2014, entitled ONE. Armstrong summarized the direction that AOL was going in 2014: "AOL has spent the last four years building platforms to facilitate the efficient and effective flow of advertising dollars to digital. We build brands – our own, and those of more than 22,000 publishers in our global network and the thousands of marketers we work with daily to help them accomplish their business goals in today's fast-moving, dynamic market. On the side of the platform of our business, as machines automate more media decisions across TV to digital, we are well-positioned to help advertisers, agencies, and publishers realize the true value of data-driven advertising."

Other work
Armstrong was involved as an angel investor in numerous projects. He is personal investor in the New York-based Tequila Avion, and with AOL invests in Betaworks. He serves on boards such as The Priceline Group, Inc. (appointed as director in 2013), the Interactive Advertising Bureau (IAB), the Advertising Research Foundation, the Paley Center for Media, the New York regional board of Teach for America, the Waterside School in Stamford, Connecticut and is Chairman Emeritus for the Advertising Council, who bestowed upon him their 60th Annual Public Service Award in 2013.  He is the chairman of the IAB Education Foundation, described by AOL as "a new non-profit working to improve diversity and close the skills gap across the digital media and advertising landscape," and serves as an advisor to the consulting firm McChrystal Group. On behalf of NYC Mayor Michael Bloomberg, he chaired Media.NYC.2020, which reviewed the future of the global media industry, the implications for NYC, and suggested actionable next steps for New York City's government.

Still a keen sports enthusiast, Armstrong is a trustee for the United States Olympic & Paralympic Foundation, and owns the Boston Blazers club which competes in the National Lacrosse League.
He also co-founded the United Football League with Bill Hambrecht.

Controversies
In August 2013, an audio recording was leaked of Armstrong offhandedly firing a Patch employee earlier that month during a conference call with over 1000 attending for taking a photo of the event. Armstrong has publicly apologized for the firing of the employee since then but did not offer to reverse the firing or provide any compensation.

In February 2014, Armstrong claimed that ObamaCare and two “distressed babies” increased healthcare costs for AOL by $7.1 million per year and that, as a result, 401(k) contribution benefits for rank-and-file employees would be modified so employees that left before the end of the year would receive no company contribution towards their 401(k).

References

External links

 Profile at AOL
 
 

Connecticut College alumni
Google employees
Living people
Warner Bros. Discovery people
United Football League (2009–2012) executives
American chairpersons of corporations
American technology company founders
AOL employees
1971 births
American technology chief executives